Dartmouth Association Football Club is a football club based in Dartmouth, Devon, England.

History

Established in 1908 as Dartmouth United, the club began competing in the Torbay and District League. They later moved into the Plymouth and District League, winning the title five times, but went back to the South Devon League for the 1968–69 season. They finished in the top two in each of their first three seasons in the South Devon League, winning the competition twice. In 1995, the club finished as runners-up in the South Devon League, winning automatic promotion to the Devon County League. They finished 4th in their first season and, the following season (1995–96), won the Premier League Cup, and finished runners-up in both the League and League Cup.

In mid-1999, Dartmouth United and Dartmouth Y.M.R.C. amalgamated to form Dartmouth A.F.C. The new club won the Devon County League title in 2001–02 and 2002–03, but opted to remain in the Devon League rather than climb the non-league pyramid.

In June 2012 before the 2012–13 season, the club faced some bad news when the FA refused to allow them to enter any national FA competitions due to not meeting the required criteria to compete. Shortly after, the club resigned from the South West Peninsula League altogether and the first team took the place of the reserve side in the South Devon League Division One. They finished in a respectable 4th in their first season in Division One before winning the division in the 2013/14 season to move up into the Premier Division. The club also won the Firewatch Devon Senior Cup in the 2013/14 season.

Dartmouth's first season back in the Premier Division (2014/15) ended with them finishing in third place and they finished as runners-up the following season (2015/16) The reserve side also won the Division Three double that year. At the end of the 2018/19 season, Dartmouth AFC won 2-0 vs Buckland Reserves to win the George Belli Cup at Dartington, with goals scored by Ryan Frost and Scott McRoy, captained by Ben Greeno. At the end of 2018–19 the South West Peninsula League was restructured, and Dartmouth successfully applied for a double promotion to the Premier Division East, at Step 6 of the National League System.
The club badge was designed by Neil Patey on the amalgamation of Dartmouth United and Dartmouth YMRC, the castles represent Dartmouth and Kingswear castles and the black and red stripes are the former colours of the two clubs. The badge was updated by player and designer, Scott Mcroy.

Ground

Dartmouth play their home games at  Longcross, Milton Lane, Dartmouth, Devon, TQ6 9LW.

Former players

One of their most famous former players is Ralph Birkett, who left Dartmouth to play for Torquay United and went on to play for the England national football team.

Season-by-season record since 1995

Honours
Devon League Champions: 3
2001–02, 2002–03, 2006–07
Devon League Runners-up: 1
1996–97
Throgmorton Cup Winners: 1
2006–07
Throgmorton Cup Runners-up: 2
1996–97, 2003–04
Devon Premier Cup Winners: 2
1996–97, 2006–07
Devon Premier Cup Finalists: 1
2000–01
Devon Senior Cup Winners: 4
1927–28, 1948–49, 1954–55, 2013-14 
Herald Cup Winners: 2
1927–28, 1973–74
South Devon League Champions: 2
1968–69, 1970–71 (Runners-up 1969–70 and 1994–95)
Devon League Charity Shield Winners: 1
2002–03
Plymouth and District League Champions: 5
George Belli Cup
2018/19

References

Football clubs in Devon
Association football clubs established in 1908
1908 establishments in England
Dartmouth, Devon
Football clubs in England
Devon County League
South Devon Football League